Sanguedo is a Portuguese parish, located in the municipality of Santa Maria da Feira. The population in 2011 was 3,600. The total land area is 4.57 km2.

Sporting club

References

Freguesias of Santa Maria da Feira